Elliptio is a genus of medium- to large-sized freshwater mussels, aquatic bivalve mollusks in the family Unionidae, commonly known as the unionids, freshwater mussels or naiads.

In contrast with many other groups of American Unionidae, the Elliptio species reach their greatest diversity in the Atlantic-draining rivers of Georgia and the Carolinas, and large parts of Florida. One species ranges north into New England and southern Canada, and two occur in the interior Mississippi drainages. Most Elliptio species have elongated shells, with silvery or purplish interior nacre beneath a thick periostracum, and few reach large size or thickness.

The genus name Elliptio refers to the elliptical shape of these bivalves.

As of 2003 there are 36 species in the genus.

Species
 Elliptio ahenea
 Elliptio angustata – Carolina lance
 Elliptio arca – Alabama spike
 Elliptio buckleyi
 Elliptio chipolaensis – Chipola slabshell
 Elliptio complanata – Eastern elliptio
 Elliptio congaraea
 Elliptio crassidens – Elephantear
 Elliptio dariensis
 Elliptio dilatata – Spike
 Elliptio downiei – Satilla elephantear
 Elliptio folliculata – pod lance
 Elliptio fraterna – brother spike
 Elliptio fumata
 Elliptio hopetonensis – Altamaha slabshell
 Elliptio icterina – variable spike
 Elliptio lanceolata – yellow lance
 Elliptio mcmichaeli – fluted elephantear
 Elliptio nigella – recovery pearly mussel, winged spike
 Elliptio producta – Atlantic spike
 Elliptio roanokensis – Roanoke slabshell
 Elliptio shepardiana – Altamaha lance
 Elliptio spinosa – Altamaha spinymussel, Georgia spinymussel
 Elliptio steinstansana – Tar River spinymussel
 Elliptio waltoni – Florida lance

References

External links

 Electric Elliptio Land. Division of Molluscs, Department of Evolution, Ecology, and Organismal Biology, The Ohio State University.

 
Bivalve genera
Taxa named by Constantine Samuel Rafinesque
Taxonomy articles created by Polbot